Woll is a village on the Ale Water, off the A7, in the Ettrick Forest, north of Hawick, and south of Selkirk in the Scottish Borders area of Scotland.

See also
List of places in the Scottish Borders
List of places in Scotland

External links
CANMORE/RCAHMS record for Bishop's Stone, Woll Rig
RCAHMS record for Woll
RCAHMS record for the Parish of Ashkirk
RCAHMS record for Woll, Stables

Villages in the Scottish Borders